Brinnon is a census-designated place (CDP) in Jefferson County, Washington, United States. The population was 797 at the 2010 census. The community is named for Ewell P. Brinnon, who in 1860 took a donation land claim at the mouth of the Duckabush River. Its known landmarks include Dosewallips State Park and Black Point Marina. Camp Parsons, founded in 1919 and the oldest Boy Scout camp west of the Mississippi River, sits just outside the north end of the CDP.

Geography
It sits on the west side of Hood Canal on the eastern edge of the Olympic National Forest. U.S. Route 101 runs the length of the community, leading south to Olympia and north  to Port Angeles.

The CDP extends from Wawa Point in the north, just south of Jackson Cove, to the Mason County line in the south at Triton Cove, and includes the unincorporated communities (from north to south) of Seal Rock, Brinnon, and Duckabush. The Dosewallips River crosses the north-central part of the CDP and enters Hood Canal at Brinnon Flats just north of the settlement of Brinnon, while the Duckabush River crosses the south-central part of the CDP, entering Hood Canal at Duckabush village, just south of Black Point.

Climate

Demographics
As of the census of 2000, there were 803 people, 413 households, and 258 families residing in the CDP. The population density was 81.3 people per square mile (31.4/km2). There were 912 housing units at an average density of 92.4/sq mi (35.7/km2). The racial makeup of the CDP was 92.65% White, 0.25% African American, 1.49% Native American, 0.62% Asian, 0.25% Pacific Islander, 1.00% from other races, and 3.74% from two or more races. Hispanic or Latino of any race were 1.99% of the population.

There were 413 households, out of which 10.7% had children under the age of 18 living with them, 55.2% were married couples living together, 5.1% had a female householder with no husband present, and 37.5% were non-families. 32.0% of all households were made up of individuals, and 14.5% had someone living alone who was 65 years of age or older. The average household size was 1.94 and the average family size was 2.36.

In the CDP, the population was spread out, with 10.7% under the age of 18, 3.1% from 18 to 24, 15.6% from 25 to 44, 34.9% from 45 to 64, and 35.7% who were 65 years of age or older. The median age was 58 years. For every 100 females, there were 110.2 males. For every 100 females age 18 and over, there were 110.9 males.

The median income for a household in the CDP was $27,885, and the median income for a family was $34,375. Males had a median income of $31,250 versus $16,500 for females. The per capita income for the CDP was $19,820. About 9.9% of families and 13.8% of the population were below the poverty line, including 23.3% of those under age 18 and 6.7% of those age 65 or over.

References

Census-designated places in Jefferson County, Washington
Census-designated places in Washington (state)